Mohammadabad-e Pain (also Romanized as Moḩammadābād-e Pā’īn; also known as Shahīd Moḩammadābād and Moḩammadābād) is a village in Ladiz Rural District, in the Central District of Mirjaveh County, Sistan and Baluchestan Province, Iran. At the 2006 census, its population was 110, in 25 families.

References 

Populated places in Mirjaveh County